Amaurobius is a genus of tangled nest spiders that was first described by Carl Ludwig Koch in 1837.

Species
 it contains sixty-seven species:
A. agastus (Chamberlin, 1947) – USA
A. annulatus (Kulczyński, 1906) – Croatia, Montenegro
A. antipovae Marusik & Kovblyuk, 2004 – Caucasus (Russia, Georgia)
A. asuncionis Mello-Leitão, 1946 – Paraguay
A. ausobskyi Thaler & Knoflach, 1998 – Greece
A. barbaricus Leech, 1972 – USA
A. barbarus Simon, 1911 – Algeria, Spain
A. borealis Emerton, 1909 – USA, Canada
A. candia Thaler & Knoflach, 2002 – Greece (Crete)
A. cerberus Fage, 1931 – Spain
A. corruptus Leech, 1972 – USA
A. crassipalpis Canestrini & Pavesi, 1870 – Germany, Switzerland, Italy
A. cretaensis Wunderlich, 1995 – Greece (Crete)
A. deelemanae Thaler & Knoflach, 1995 – Greece, Crete
A. diablo Leech, 1972 – USA
A. distortus Leech, 1972 – USA
A. dorotheae (Chamberlin, 1947) – USA
A. drenskii Kratochvíl, 1934 – Bosnia and Herzegovina
A. erberi (Keyserling, 1863) – Canary Is., Europe, Turkey, Caucasus
A. fenestralis (Ström, 1768) (type) – Europe to Central Asia
A. ferox (Walckenaer, 1830) – Europe, Turkey. Introduced to Canada, USA, Mexico
A. festae Caporiacco, 1934 – Libya
A. galeritus Leech, 1972 – USA
A. geminus Thaler & Knoflach, 2002 – Greece (Crete)
A. hagiellus (Chamberlin, 1947) – USA
A. heathi (Chamberlin, 1947) – USA
A. hercegovinensis Kulczyński, 1915 – Bosnia and Herzegovina, Montenegro
A. intermedius Leech, 1972 – USA
A. jugorum L. Koch, 1868 – Europe
A. koponeni Marusik, Ballarin & Omelko, 2012 – India
A. kratochvili Miller, 1938 – Croatia, Albania
A. latebrosus Simon, 1874 – France (Corsica)
A. latescens (Chamberlin, 1919) – USA
A. leechi Brignoli, 1983 – USA
A. lesbius Bosmans, 2011 – Greece
A. longipes Thaler & Knoflach, 1995 – Greece
A. mathetes (Chamberlin, 1947) – USA
A. mephisto (Chamberlin, 1947) – USA
A. minor Kulczyński, 1915 – Eastern Europe
A. minorca Barrientos & Febrer, 2018 – Spain (Menorca)
A. minutus Leech, 1972 – USA
A. obustus L. Koch, 1868 – Europe
A. occidentalis Simon, 1893 – Portugal, Spain, France
A. ossa Thaler & Knoflach, 1993 – Greece
A. pallidus L. Koch, 1868 – Southeastern Europe to Georgia
A. palomar Leech, 1972 – USA
A. paon Thaler & Knoflach, 1993 – Greece
A. pavesii Pesarini, 1991 – Italy
A. pelops Thaler & Knoflach, 1991 – Greece
A. pesarinii Ballarin & Pantini, 2017 – Italy
A. phaeacus Thaler & Knoflach, 1998 – Albania, Macedonia, Greece
A. prosopidus Leech, 1972 – USA
A. ruffoi Thaler, 1990 – Italy
A. scopolii Thorell, 1871 – France, Italy, Slovenia
A. similis (Blackwall, 1861) – Europe, Caucasus. Introduced to North America
A. songi Zhang, Wang & Zhang, 2018 – China
A. spinatus Zhang, Wang & Zhang, 2018 – China
A. strandi Charitonov, 1937 – Greece, Bulgaria, Ukraine
A. tamalpais Leech, 1972 – USA
A. thoracicus Mello-Leitão, 1945 – Argentina
A. transversus Leech, 1972 – USA
A. triangularis Leech, 1972 – USA
A. tristis L. Koch, 1875 – Eritrea
A. tulare Leech, 1972 – USA
A. vachoni Hubert, 1965 – Spain
A. vexans Leech, 1972 – USA
A. yanoianus Nakatsudi, 1943 – Micronesia

See also
 List of Amaurobiidae species

References

 
Araneomorphae genera
Cosmopolitan spiders
Taxa named by Carl Ludwig Koch